Philippe Goitschel (born 1962) is a French skier. He won a silver medal in speed skiing, a demonstration sport at the 1992 Winter Olympics in Albertville, France.

He is the nephew of champion skiers of the 1960s, Christine and Marielle Goitschel, sisters of his mother Patricia.

He achieved a world record for speed skiing, achieving a speed of 250.7 km/h (155.434 mph) at Les Arcs on April 23, 2002. After breaking the record, Goitschel announced his retirement from competitive skiing.

References

1962 births
Living people
French male alpine skiers
Olympic alpine skiers of France
Speed skiers at the 1992 Winter Olympics
Medalists at the 1992 Winter Olympics
Olympic silver medalists for France
Olympic medalists in alpine skiing
20th-century French people